Starhotels is a privately owned hotel chain based in Florence that operates 30 luxury hotels (24 in Italy, three in London, and one each in Paris and New York City).

The hotels strive to have a "made in Italy" feel and most of the hotels are four-star hotels with The Michelangelo (formerly the Hotel Taft) in New York City and Castille Paris being five star hotels.

See also
 Castille Paris, Paris, France
 The Michelangelo, New York City
 Rosa Grand, Milan, Italy
 Savoia Excelsior Palace, Trieste, Italy
 Splendid Venice, Venice, Italy
 Starhotels Anderson, Milan, Italy

References

Companies based in Florence
Hotels established in 1980
Hospitality companies of Italy
Hotel chains in Italy